The 2014–15 Portland State Vikings men's basketball team represented Portland State University during the 2014–15 NCAA Division I men's basketball season. The Vikings, led by sixth year head coach Tyler Geving, played their home games at the Peter Stott Center and were members of the Big Sky Conference. They finished the season 15–14, 9–9 in Big Sky play to finish in sixth place. They lost in the quarterfinals of the Big Sky tournament to Sacramento State.

Roster

Schedule

|-
!colspan=9 style="background:#02461D; color:#FFFFFF;"| Exhibition

|-
!colspan=9 style="background:#02461D; color:#FFFFFF;"| Regular season

|-
!colspan=9 style="background:#02461D; color:#FFFFFF;"| Big Sky tournament

See also
2014–15 Portland State Vikings women's basketball team

References

Portland State Vikings men's basketball seasons
Portland State
Portland State Vikings men's basketball
Portland State Vikings men's basketball
Port
Port